Superstition as Ideology in Iranian Politics: From Majlesi to Ahmadinejad is a 2011 book by Ali Rahnema in which the author examines the role of superstition in Iranian politics.

Content
Rahnema argues that superstition as well as mystical beliefs have shaped political ideology and strategy in Iran since the first days of the Safavid dynasty in the sixteenth century until today. As author shows through a close examination of the Persian sources and with sample instances from contemporary politics in Iran, the mysterious relation to the hidden sphere has allowed leaders such as Muhammad Reza Pahlavi and Mahmud Ahmadinejad to introduce themselves and their close people as representatives of the divine, and their enemies and rivals as the messengers of evil.

Reception
The book has been reviewed in Iranian Studies and Archives de sciences sociales des religions.

References

External links 
 Superstition as Ideology in Iranian Politics: From Majlesi to Ahmadinejad

2011 non-fiction books
English-language books
Books about politics of Iran
Cambridge University Press books
History books about Iran